Kastos is a Greek island and a former community east of the island of Lefkada, Ionian Islands, Greece. Since the 2011 local government reform it is part of the municipality Lefkada, of which it is a municipal unit. Until 1974, when it became part of the Lefkada Prefecture, the island was administered under the Cephalonia Prefecture (Ithaca province).

Geography

The island has only one village, the homonymous Kastos, located on its east coast. It has a population of about 80, involved mainly in tourism services, as well as fishing. During the summer Kastioti of the diaspora return for holidays and together with the fluctuating visitors arriving on yachts, form its seasonal character.
Kastos has two churches, Agios Ioannis Prodromos, which is located in the centre of the village, and Agios Emilianos, located about  northeastern of the village. Agios Ioannis church is decorated with wall paintings from the notable Eptanesian painter Spyridon Gazis.
Also, the island has two windmills and three olive presses, none of them functioning anymore.

Population

Facilities

The island has a range of facilities such as a mini-market, three bars, four restaurants and a small gift shop. 
All facilities are open during the summer, however most close during the winter months of the island. The island has two harbours for boat mooring, one located on the front of the island, the other located at the back, in a bay called Sarakiniko.

See also
List of settlements in the Lefkada regional unit

References

External links
Kastos (island) information
Kastos (village) information

Islands of Greece
Islands of the Ionian Islands (region)
Populated places in Lefkada (regional unit)
Landforms of Lefkada (regional unit)